This is a list of television writers for the science fiction television programme Doctor Who. It is sortable by a number of different criteria.  The list defaults to ascending alphabetical order by writer's last name.

A "writer of Doctor Who" is defined as a person who received onscreen credit for a live action, non-parodic story. E.g. Terrance Dicks wrote four of the six episodes of The Seeds of Death in reality, but since Brian Hayles is the only name to appear on screen he receives the credit. The notes shed light on the work writers actually did on particular stories.

List of writers 
Further details about the way in which this list was compiled can be found by clicking the footnote marker at the top of each column. Information on this list is current through to Series 13.

Notes

See also
List of Doctor Who script editors
List of Doctor Who producers
List of Torchwood writers
List of The Sarah Jane Adventures writers

Writers
Doctor Who